William Garrard may refer to:

William Garrard (b. 1518-d. 1571)
William Garrard (died 1545), MP for New Romney (UK Parliament constituency)
William George Garrard, rugby union player
Bill Garrard, politician